Day & Age is the third studio album by American rock band the Killers. It was released on November 18, 2008, by Island Records. Frontman and lead vocalist Brandon Flowers described it as the band's "most playful record". , Day & Age had sold three million copies worldwide. Following the release of the album, the band embarked on the Day & Age World Tour.

Production
The band began writing the tracks for Day & Age while on the road during the Sam's Town Tour. Producer Stuart Price had worked on a few remixes for the Killers, but the band had still never met him until they connected in London in 2006. Price and the band had dinner, before returning to his home studio and recording the lead single "Human" in two hours. The band recorded demos in Las Vegas and sent them to Price in London over the Internet, who would then call back to discuss the recordings. With the album largely done, the Killers met at their Las Vegas studio in May 2008 to put the finishing touches to the album. Flowers stated that the concept for the album is a "continuation" of Sam's Town, saying "it's like looking at Sam's Town from Mars".

When asked about the meaning behind the album's title, Flowers replied, "I don't know. You wait for moments. I just wait for it to come, and I knew that [Day & Age] was right when I had it." The album's title is also part of the lyrics to two of the album's tracks: "Neon Tiger" and "The World We Live In".

The Killers enlisted Paul Normansell to create the artwork for the album. Portraits of the band members themselves are included in the album. These portraits can be seen at various parts of the "Human" video, as well as the cover of Day & Age and the CD insert. On December 8, 2008, Rolling Stone named the album cover for Day & Age the best album cover of 2008. On December 15, Rolling Stone readers voted Day & Age the best album of 2008.

In an interview with Rolling Stone in September 2009, Flowers commented on the album, stating:
"It sits well with our other two albums. It's obviously a little more on the pop end of things; it's not quite as masculine as Sam's Town, but I like it. 'Spaceman' is such a playful tune, it makes my body do things I've never done before. 'Human' is one of our best recordings so far. I don't think we've made our best album yet, and that makes me happy, to know it's still out there."

Singles
The first single from the album, "Human", was released to radio on September 22, 2008, and became available for download on September 30, 2008. The band performed "Human" and "Spaceman" on the October 4, 2008, episode of Saturday Night Live. They released the video for "Human" in October 2008.

"Spaceman" was released digitally on November 4, 2008, in the US. The vinyl edition was released in the US on November 18, 2008, and included a free download of the album from Island Records. The music video premiered in January 2009.

"The World We Live In" was released as the third single in Europe and Australia, while "A Dustland Fairytale" served as the third single in the United States. The single "The World We Live In" has been described as "a song that gives you a Disney/floating-in-the-air feeling" by music critic Brian Narvaez.

As with the album cover, the singles' covers were designed by Paul Normansell and consist of the same individual-band-member images that appear in the album's booklet. Dave Keuning's picture was used for the "Human" cover, and the "Spaceman" cover was Brandon Flowers. Ronnie Vannucci Jr.'s picture features on the single "The World We Live In". Mark Stoermer is on the cover for the single "A Dustland Fairytale".

Additionally, the band released a video for "Goodnight, Travel Well" in partnership with MTV EXIT, UNICEF, and USAID in order to raise awareness about human trafficking. It premiered globally on MTV on July 13, 2009, and on UNICEF's YouTube page the next day.

Promotion
In support of the album, the Killers embarked on their third concert tour, the Day & Age Tour. The tour became their biggest effort to date, with sold-out shows across six continents.

Critical reception

Day & Age received generally positive reviews from music critics. At Metacritic, which assigns a normalized rating out of 100 to reviews from mainstream publications, the album received an average score of 69, based on 31 reviews. Edna Gundersen of USA Today called Day & Age "outstanding" and "a fresh and immediate arena-rock triumph". She continued, "The sound isn't just bigger, it's transnational, yielding the kind of radiant, whip-smart rock album you seldom hear in this day and age." Jill Menze of Billboard called the album a "gamble" and said "if nothing else, this band keeps fans on their toes, and they're likely to buy in for another round." Entertainment Weeklys Leah Greenblatt commented on the album's influences from Duran Duran, Bono and David Bowie and ultimately said, "Like Vegas itself, Day & Age sometimes leans toward sensory overload. But the pull of its showgirls-and-fool's-gold glory is undeniable." Stacey Anderson of Spin called it "a respectably vivacious dance-rock album." Michael Franco of PopMatters stated, "The bulk of the album... sees the Killers doing what they do best: crafting new wave dance songs that sound like lost classics from the '80s."

In a mixed review, Ryan Dombal of Pitchfork characterized Day & Age as "the Killers' spitball album, the one where they try everything and see what works while Flowers grasps for a relatable tone." Q concluded that the album contained "four great songs, two so-so ones and four duds", while noting that "the spirit in which it was made merits goodwill." Drowned in Sound reviewer Andrzej Lukowski found that the Killers rarely deviated from "breezy synth pop" on what he ultimately termed "an enjoyable but fairly throwaway pop record."

Accolades

Commercial performance
Day & Age debuted at number six on the US Billboard 200, selling 193,000 copies in its first week. The album was certified gold by the Recording Industry Association of America (RIAA) on January 27, 2009, and by July 2012, it had sold 774,000 copies in the United States. Day & Age debuted at number one on the UK Albums Chart with 200,299 copies sold in its first week, becoming the band's third consecutive number-one studio album on the chart. On February 12, 2010, it was certified four-times platinum by the British Phonographic Industry (BPI). , the album had sold 1.31 million copies in the United Kingdom.

Track listing

Personnel
Credits adapted from the liner notes of Day & Age.

Studios
 Battle Born Studios (Las Vegas, Nevada) – engineering
 Olympic Studios (London) – mixing
 Metropolis Studios (London) – mastering

The Killers
 Brandon Flowers
 Dave Keuning
 Mark Stoermer
 Ronnie Vannucci Jr.

Additional musicians
 Daniel de los Reyes – additional percussion 
 Tommy Marth – saxophone

Technical

 Stuart Price – production, mixing
 The Killers – production
 Robert Root – engineering
 Dave Emery – mixing assistance
 Alex Dromgoole – mixing assistance
 Ted Sablay – additional engineering 
 Tim Young – mastering

Artwork

 Paul Normansell – artwork, paintings
 Erik Weiss – band photo
 Julian Peploe Studio – package design
 Kristen Yiengst – art/package coordination
 Doug Joswick – package production

Charts

Weekly charts

Year-end charts

Certifications and sales

Release history

References

2008 albums
Albums produced by Stuart Price
Dance-rock albums
Island Records albums
The Killers albums
Synth-pop albums by American artists
Vertigo Records albums